Rajesh Bishnoi (born 25 January 1990) is an Indian cricketer who plays for Meghalaya. He made his first-class debut for Rajasthan in the 2016–17 Ranji Trophy on 13 November 2016.

References

External links
 

1990 births
Living people
Indian cricketers
Rajasthan cricketers
Place of birth missing (living people)